Spatuloricaria tuira, commonly known as Tuira's whiptail or the marbled Xingu whiptail, is a species of catfish in the family Loricariidae. It is native to South America, where it occurs in the basins of the Xingu River and the Tapajós in Brazil. It is typically seen at the bottom of medium to large rivers with fast water flow and substrates composed of rocks or sand. The species reaches 46 cm (18.1 inches) in total length and can weigh up to at least 130 g.

Spatuloricaria tuira was described in 2014 by Ilana Fichberg (of the Federal University of São Paulo), Osvaldo Takeshi Oyakawa (of the University of São Paulo), and Mario de Pinna (also of the University of São Paulo). Its specific name, tuira, honors a Kayapo woman who "became a symbol of the resistance against the construction of hydroelectric dams on the Rio Xingu". It does not refer to the Tuira River, which, although not an area in which Spatuloricaria tuira occurs, is part of the native range of the related species S. fimbriata.

References 

Loricariini
Fish described in 2014
Catfish of South America
Freshwater fish of Brazil